Sugar Free Farm is a British television show that sees celebrities take on a sugar-free diet. It debuted on ITV on 26 January 2016.

Episodes

Series 1 (2016)

Celebrities
The celebrities were announced in December 2015/January 2016.

Ratings

Series 2 (2017)

Celebrities
The celebrities for the second series were announced in November 2016.

References

External links
 
 

2016 British television series debuts
2017 British television series endings
2010s British reality television series
English-language television shows
ITV reality television shows